Thomas Melville (7 October 1852 – 13 November 1942) was a Scottish Presbyterian resident in London who was a member of Southgate Urban District Council and chairman of the council during the First World War.

Early life and family
Thomas Melville was born in  Edinburgh to Thomas Melville and his wife, Agnes Allan. He moved to London, where he married Mary Elizabeth Turner (died 20 October 1925) in 1881. They lived in Tottenham before moving to Southgate prior to 1891. He worked as a tobacco merchant.

Local affairs
Melville was instrumental in establishing the Presbyterian Church in Fox Lane, Palmers Green, which opened in 1914, and attracted a large number of emigrant Scots to the area. The church was demolished in the 1980s. He was a member of Southgate Urban District Council and chairman of the council during the First World War. He resided at Old Park House, built for the Dowcra family in 1833 and part of the Old Park Estate.

Death
Melville died on 13 November 1942 and is buried along with his wife at Southgate Cemetery.

References

External links 
https://www.flickr.com/photos/75145129@N02/7992614402/in/album-72157631551022939/
https://www.flickr.com/photos/75145129@N02/albums/72157631551022939/page1

1852 births
1942 deaths
Councillors in South East England
Scottish Presbyterians
Politicians from Edinburgh
People from Southgate, London
Palmers Green